Ancistrus piriformis is a species of catfish in the family Loricariidae. It is native to South America, where it occurs in the Acaray River basin, which is part of the Paraná River drainage in Paraguay, although it has also been reported from Argentina. The species reaches 8.3 cm (3.3 inches) SL.

References 

Fish described in 1989
piriformis